58P/Jackson–Neujmin is a periodic comet in the Solar System with a current orbital period of 8.19 years.

The comet was discovered on a photographic plate on 20 September 1936 by Cyril Jackson of the Union Observatory, South Africa, who described it as faint and diffuse, with a brightness of magnitude 12. On the following day Grigory N. Neujmin of the Simeis Observatory, in Crimea, Russia discovered it independently. Fernand Rigaux of the Royal Observatory in Uccle, Belgium then also found it on an earlier photographic plate exposed on 9 September 1936.

The predicted 1945 apparition was not observed due to uncertainty about its position and appearance date and even Elizabeth Roemer was unable to find it in 1953. 1961 was again very difficult but Charles Kowal managed to relocate it in September, 1970. The 1995 appearance was more favourable and brightness reached a magnitude of 10. The comet wasn't observed during its 2004 or 2012 apparitions, and was thought to be potentially lost until it was successfully recovered in April 2020 at magnitude 12 by the Solar Wind Anisotropies (SWAN) camera on the Solar Heliospheric Observer (SOHO) spacecraft. Due to an outburst event the magnitude increased from 12 to 10 in late March 2020.

See also
 List of numbered comets

References
 

Periodic comets
0058
19360920